Tõnis Kask (2 December 1929, in Tarvastu Parish, Viljandi County – 27 August 2016) was an Estonian film and television director and screenwriter.

1953 he graduated from Lunacharsky State Institute for Theatre Arts' (GITIS) Estonian studio. Since 1961 he was the principal director and artistic leader of Tallnn Television Studio (part of Estonian Television). 1982-1984 he worked at Estonian Television. 1984-1987 he was a director at Tallinnfilm. 1987-1992 he was the chief editor at Eesti Telefilm.

Awards:
 2004: Order of the White Star, IV class.

Filmography

 1989: Kaugel, ookeani serval
 1990: Kaugete aegade lugu	
 1991: Vana mees tahab koju	
 1993-2003: Õnne 13 	
 1993: Talujutud maa ja taeva vahel" 	
 2006: Reekviem rukkile?''

References

Living people
1929 births
2016 deaths
Estonian film directors
Estonian screenwriters
Recipients of the Order of the White Star, 4th Class
People from Viljandi Parish
Burials at Pärnamäe Cemetery